James Andersen may refer to:

James Roy Andersen (1925–1945), brigadier general in the United States Army Air Forces
Jim Ronny Andersen (born 1975), Norwegian badminton player
James A. Andersen (1924–2022), American politician and judge in the state of Washington

See also
James Anderson (disambiguation)